Council of Nicaea can refer to:

 First Council of Nicaea in AD 325
 Second Council of Nicaea in AD 787
 The Council of Nicaea (audio drama)
 The Council of Nicaea (painting)